Sonia Francine Gaspar Marmo (August 25, 1967), called Soninha Francine, is a Brazilian journalist, television presenter and politician.

Born in the Santana neighborhood in São Paulo, she graduated in cinema from University of São Paulo's School of Communications and Arts (ECA-USP), and participated in some films made by students of the cinema course at ECA, as well as a stage actress, but became nationally known as VJ of MTV Brasil.

Career on media 
Soninha started working at MTV in São Paulo as a production assistant, then as a director and production coordinator, and then a writer, writing the texts for the VJs.  In 1994, she started to work as a presenter herself, replacing the VJs.  She stayed at the station for ten years.

In 2000, she joined TV Cultura as a host of the "RG" program, aimed at young people.  During this period, she became involved in a controversial episode: a cover story in Época magazine, where she admitted that she was a marijuana user and defended its decriminalization. After the story, TV Cultura terminated her contract

Political career 
In 2004, she ran for and won the election for city councilor of the city of São Paulo by the Partido dos Trabalhadores - PT, with a total of 50,989 votes, exercising her term until 2008. In the São Paulo City Council, he defended issues related to LGBT rights youth, sport, culture, accessibility, information technology and knowledge democratization, housing and the environment.

She was a proponent and rapporteur of the Parliamentary Commission of Inquiry for Labor Analogous to Slavery in the municipality of São Paulo and rapporteur of the Parliamentary Commission for Studies on Climate Change and its effects in the municipality of São Paulo..

In 2006, she ran for the election for federal deputy for PT, but was not elected, receiving a total of 44,953 votes.

In 2008 she ran for mayor of São Paulo, after switching PT for PPS. Soninha got 266,978 votes (4.19% of total votes).In 2009, she was named sub-mayor of Lapa by the mayor of São Paulo, Gilberto Kassab.  She remained in the position until March 31, 2010, when he left with the intention of running for Governor of São Paulo state, which ended up not happening as her party decided to support the Brazilian Social Democracy Party candidate Geraldo Alckmin.  Then, in the same year, she was editor of the official website of José Serra's campaign for president.

 In February 2011, she assumed the position of superintendent at SUTACO, from which he left in June 2012 to run for the second time for the city of São Paulo.  She got 162,384 votes (2.65% of valid votes) in the 1st round.  In the 2nd, she declared support for José Serra's candidacy.

In 2013, she wrote the Blog Tecla Sap, "Translating Politics to Portuguese".

In 2015, she was invited, by governor Geraldo Alckmin, to assume the Coordination of Policies for Sexual Diversity in São Paulo. In the 2016 municipal elections, Soninha was elected councilwoman with 40,113 votes.

References

Brazilian environmentalists
Workers' Party (Brazil) politicians
Brazilian bloggers
Brazilian women bloggers
Brazilian socialists
Brazilian people of Italian descent
Brazilian Buddhists
1967 births
Brazilian television presenters
Brazilian women television presenters
People from São Paulo
University of São Paulo alumni
Living people